The 39th Blue Dragon Film Awards ceremony was held on November 23, 2018 at Kyung Hee University's Peace Palace Hall in Seoul. It was live broadcast on SBS and hosted by Kim Hye-soo and Yoo Yeon-seok. Organized by Sports Chosun (a sister brand of Chosun Ilbo), the annual award show honored the best in Korean language films released from October 12, 2017 to October 11, 2018.

Nominations and winners 

Complete list of nominees and winners

Winners are listed first, highlighted in boldface, and indicated with a double dagger.

Main awards

Other awards

 Best Short Film: 
A New Record (Director Heo Ji-eun & Lee Kyung-ho)
 Audience Choice Award for Most Popular Film:
1st – Along with the Gods: The Two Worlds
2nd – Along with the Gods: The Last 49 Days
3rd – 1987: When the Day Comes
4th – The Great Battle
5th – Believer
 Popular Star Award:
Ju Ji-hoon – The Spy Gone North
Kim Young-kwang – On Your Wedding Day
Kim Hyang-gi – Along with the Gods: The Two Worlds
Jin Seo-yeon – Believer

Films with multiple wins 
The following films received multiple wins:

Films with multiple nominations 
The following films received multiple nominations:

Presenters

Special performances

References 

2018 film awards
Blue Dragon Film Awards
2018 in South Korean cinema